Hamber is a surname. Notable people with the surname include:

Eric Hamber (1879–1960), Canadian businessman and the 15th Lieutenant Governor of British Columbia
Jan Hamber, American ornithologist and conservationist
John Hamber (1931–2013), sailor who represented the United States Virgin Islands

See also 
Eric Hamber Secondary School, is a public secondary school located in the South Cambie neighbourhood of Vancouver, British Columbia, Canada
Hamber Provincial Park, is a provincial park in British Columbia, Canada